Euphaedra marginalis is a butterfly in the family Nymphalidae. It is found in the Democratic Republic of the Congo (Ubangi, Mongala and Uele).

References

Butterflies described in 1979
marginalis
Endemic fauna of the Democratic Republic of the Congo
Butterflies of Africa